Şükrullah was a 15th-century Ottoman historian and diplomat.<ref name=OHHW196>'''The Oxford History of Historical Writing' Volume 3: 1400–1800, José Rabasa,D. Daniel R. Woolf, p. 196, 2011 by Oxford University Press</ref> He was one of the earliest Ottoman historians.

 Biography 

Şükrullah was born in 1388 and his father's name was Şehâbeddin Ahmed. He entered the Ottoman service in 1409. He served as judge in Bursa. In 1449, Şükrullah was sent by Murad II to the Qoyunlu Confederacy as an ambassador. It was here, during the reign of Jahan Shah, that he encountered a history of the Oghuz Turks.

 Works 

His works include both historical and religious writings. He wrote a famous universal history in the 1460s Persian language named Behcetü't-Tevârîh or Bahjut al-tâwarikh'' (Joy of Histories) and presented it to Mahmud Pasha Angelovic. His work was used by later Ottoman historians.

References

Sources

1388 births
1488 deaths
15th-century historians from the Ottoman Empire
15th-century Persian-language writers